Chen Lu'an (born January 10, 1988) is a Chinese male curler.

At the international level, he is a three-time .

Teams

References

External links

Living people
1988 births

Chinese male curlers
Pacific-Asian curling champions
Place of birth missing (living people)
Competitors at the 2007 Winter Universiade
Competitors at the 2009 Winter Universiade
Universiade medalists in curling
Universiade bronze medalists for China